Copelatus normalis is a species of diving beetle. It is part of the genus Copelatus in the subfamily Copelatinae of the family Dytiscidae. It was described by Wilhelm Ferdinand Erichson in 1847.

References

normalis
Beetles described in 1847